Kantavati Devi (Kantawati Devi Jha) (?–31 October 1799) was the favourite wife of Rana Bahadur Shah, King of Kingdom of Nepal. She was the mother of Girvan Yuddha Bikram Shah. She died of smallpox.

References

Nepalese queens consort
1799 deaths
Deaths from smallpox
People of the Nepalese unification
18th-century Nepalese people
18th-century Nepalese nobility
Nepalese Hindus
Maithil Brahmin